The Greatest Game Ever Played is a 2005 American biographical sports film based on the early life of amateur golf champion Francis Ouimet and his surprise winning of the 1913 U.S. Open. The film was directed by Bill Paxton, and was his last film as a director. Shia LaBeouf plays the role of Ouimet. The film's screenplay was adapted by Mark Frost from his 2002 book, The Greatest Game Ever Played: Harry Vardon, Francis Ouimet, and the Birth of Modern Golf. It was shot in Montreal, Quebec, Canada, with the Kanawaki Golf Club, in Kahnawake, Quebec, the site of the golf sequences.

Plot
Set mainly in 1913, the film is about Francis Ouimet (Shia LaBeouf), the first amateur to win the U.S. Open. Amateur golf in that era was a sport only for the wealthy, and Ouimet came from an Irish and French-Canadian immigrant family that was part of the working class. Ouimet watches an exhibition by legendary Jersey golf pro Harry Vardon (Stephen Dillane) as a 7-year-old boy, and becomes very interested in golf. He begins as a caddie at The Country Club, a posh enclave located across the street from his home in suburban Brookline, Massachusetts, while making friends with the other caddies. He works on his own golf game at every chance, and gradually accumulates his own set of clubs. Francis practices putting at night in his room. He wins the Massachusetts Schoolboy Championship.

One day, a Club member, Mr. Hastings (Justin Ashforth), asks Ouimet to play with him over The Country Club course, where caddies have almost no access of their own, and he shoots a fine round of 81 despite a 9 on one hole. His talent, composure, and good manners earn admirers and interest. With the help of Mr. Hastings and the Club Caddiemaster, Francis gets a chance to play in an upcoming tournament, the U.S. Amateur, the local qualifying for which is to be held at the very same Country Club course. However, his father Arthur (Elias Koteas) tells his son to quit golf and get a "real job". Ouimet needs $50 for the entry fee, and so agrees to get a real job and never play golf again if he could not qualify; his father lends him the money. On the 18th, Francis faces a three-foot putt that would secure him a spot in the championship, but he looks over and his father is watching. Ouimet is distracted, misses and falls one stroke short of qualifying for the championship proper.

With much jeer from the rich folk, Ouimet, now 20, fulfills his promise to his dad and works at a sporting goods shop, while continuing to live at home. After some time with his golf forgotten, Ouimet is still at the bottom of the working class. But one day, the president of the United States Golf Association enters the store and personally invites him to play in the upcoming U.S. Open. After some maneuvering and consideration from his employer, Ouimet secures entry. His father informs Ouimet that he must find his own place to live after the tournament and Ouimet agrees to this arrangement. However, his mother has been supportive of his golf from the start. She admonishes Ouimet's father for not recognizing Ouimet's talent and that he now has a chance to demonstrate it in an important tournament.

Ouimet competes in the 1913 U.S. Open that takes place at The Country Club. The favorites are British champions Vardon and Ted Ray (Stephen Marcus), who are accompanied by the snobbish Lord Northcliffe (Peter Firth), and the reigning U.S. Open champion, John McDermott. Northcliffe looks to see that either Vardon or Ray wins the Open, to affirm British dominance over the Americans in golf, and also to prove that only gentlemen were able champions. Ouimet competes with his 10-year old friend, Eddie Lowery (Josh Flitter), who skips school to caddie for Ouimet. After the first two rounds, Vardon and Ray have a seemingly comfortable lead, with McDermott unable to keep up. After some initial struggles, Ouimet rallies back and ends up tying with Vardon and Ray at the end of the fourth round, meaning that the three of them would compete in an 18-hole playoff to determine the champion. The night before, Northcliffe mocks Ouimet's social status to Vardon, who came from humble beginnings himself, and Vardon finally tells Northcliffe that he is going to try to win only for his own pride, not Britain's and that if Ouimet wins, it will be because of his own skill, not his background.

The playoff round commences, with all three competitors keeping it close until the final holes, where Ray fades out, and Ouimet ahead of Vardon by a stroke going into the final hole. Vardon finishes with a par, giving Ouimet the chance to clinch the win with a par himself. Seeing him become nervous before the final putt, Eddie calms him down, and Ouimet is able to make the putt and win the U.S. Open. As the crowd carries him and Eddie on their shoulders, they start to hand him money. Ouimet refuses it all, only accepting one bill from his now proud father. In the clubhouse, Vardon privately congratulates Ouimet and suggests that they should play a friendly round together in the future. Ouimet and Eddie then walk home, carrying the U.S. Open trophy.

A series of texts shows that Harry Vardon went on to win his sixth British Open Championship the following year, also Francis won two amateur championships and became a businessman and Eddie went on to become a multi-millionaire.

Historical accuracy
The movie shows a dramatic finish in the playoff, with Ouimet sinking a putt on the 18th hole to win the Championship by a single stroke. In reality, Ouimet finished birdie-par on 17 and 18 to Vardon's bogey-double bogey to end the playoff five strokes clear of Vardon and six ahead of Ray.  The movie also shows the playoff as being in fair weather, and moves the rain to the third round. In the movie the historical 17th hole plays as a "dog leg right" when in fact at Brookline Country Club is played as a "dog leg left".

Cast

Reception

Box office
The film opened at #9 at the U.S. box office in its opening weekend grossing US$3,657,322.

Critical
The film received generally positive reviews, from golf fans and non fans of the sport alike. Roger Ebert gave it three out of four stars, stating it gave the real history of the greatest golf match with a strong human element while showing the golf play in a "gripping story".  He notes that he is "not a golf fan but found (it) absorbing all the same... Paxton and his technicians have used every trick in the book to dramatize the flight and destination of the golf balls. We follow balls through the air, we watch them creep toward the green or stray into the rough, we get not only an eagle's-eye view but a club's-eye view and sometimes, I am convinced, a ball's-eye view." Larry King proclaimed it "every bit as good as Seabiscuit."

On the review aggregation website Rotten Tomatoes, 63% of critics gave the film a positive "fresh" review. The website concludes, "Despite all the underdog sports movie conventions, the likable cast and lush production values make The Greatest Game Ever Played a solid and uplifting tale."

Awards and accolades

Home media
The film has been released on DVD and UMD by Walt Disney Home Entertainment. Special features include two "making of" documentaries with cast and crew members, plus a rare 1963 interview with the real Francis Ouimet on WGBH, the Boston public television station, at Brookline, Massachusetts golf course where the 1913 U.S. Open took place. It was released on Blu-ray Disc in 2009, and again as a DVD/Blu-ray combo pack in 2011. It is now available to stream via Disney+ as of 2019.

References

External links
 

Interviews with Shia Labeouf, Bill Paxton, and Mark Frost on LIFETEEN.com

2005 films
2000s biographical films
2000s sports films
Films scored by Brian Tyler
Films based on non-fiction books
Films directed by Bill Paxton
Films set in 1913
Films set in Massachusetts
Films shot in Montreal
Golf films
Films with screenplays by Mark Frost
Sports films based on actual events
Walt Disney Pictures films
Cultural depictions of William Howard Taft
Cultural depictions of golfers
Biographical films about sportspeople
2000s English-language films
American sports drama films